"Ain't Nothing Gonna Keep Me From You" is a song written by Barry Gibb in 1977. It was recorded by Teri DeSario and was her debut single and was included on her debut album Pleasure Train (1978). It entered the US charts on 22 July 1978, the same week that the number-one single was Andy Gibb's "Shadow Dancing", which was co-written by Barry and co-produced by Albhy Galuten. The musicians who played on this song also played on "Shadow Dancing". The single peaked at #43 on the Billboard Hot 100.

Her next single "The Stuff Dreams Are Made Of" was released in the same year, this song was chosen as the B-side. In 1992, Unidisc released this song as the B-side and the A-side was Alicia Bridges' "I Love the Nightlife". The song also reached #52 in the United Kingdom.

Background and recording
Co-producer Albhy Galuten heard DeSario in a club, and Gibb was involved in recording a song for her and Barry sang background vocals in a falsetto style on this song and provided lead vocal on the line: No nothing.

The musicians who played on this song also participated on Andy Gibb's album Shadow Dancing, Joey Murcia and George Terry on guitar, George Bitzer and Paul Harris on keyboards, George Perry on bass and Ron Ziegler on drums and The Boneroo Horns consisted of Peter Graves, Whit Sidener, Ken Faulk, Bill Purse, Neil Bonsanti and Stan Webb, the orchestra was arranged by Albhy Galuten, engineered by Karl Richardson, produced by Barry Gibb, Galuten and Richardson.

George Bitzer from the group Network participated on this track and horn player Bill Purse was married to Teri DeSario. It was recorded around February 1978 same month as Barry recorded "Grease" performed by Frankie Valli with Peter Frampton on guitar. The 22 July 1978 US charts when this song was charted, "Grease" was at number 6.

A 2005 version of the song also with DeSario on vocals was released in the Philippines as a promotion to her concert with Joe Pizzulo  that version was arranged by Frederick Garcia.

Personnel

 Teri DeSario - lead vocals
 Barry Gibb - background vocals
 Joey Murcia - guitar
 George Terry - guitar
 George Bitzer - keyboards
 Paul Harris - keyboards
 George Perry - bass
 Ron Ziegler - drums
 Peter Graves - horns
 Whit Sidener - horns
 Ken Faulk - horns 
 Bill Purse - horns
 Neil Bonsanti - horns
 Stan Webb - horns
 Albhy Galuten - orchestral arrangement
 Karl Richardson - engineer

References

External links
 

Songs written by Barry Gibb
Song recordings produced by Barry Gibb
1977 songs
1978 debut singles
Disco songs
Funk songs
Teri DeSario songs
Song recordings produced by Albhy Galuten
Casablanca Records singles